Steinbachiella leptoclada is recently reinstated species of legume in the family Fabaceae, assigned to the informal monophyletic Dalbergia clade of the Dalbergieae. It is the only member of the monotypic genus Steinbachiella.

References

Dalbergieae
Monotypic Fabaceae genera